Random Abstract is a jazz album by saxophonist Branford Marsalis recorded August 12–13, 1987 at Sound City Studios in Tokyo, Japan. It peaked at number 6 on the Top Jazz Albums chart. It was nominated for two Grammy Awards in 1988, Best Jazz Instrumental Performance, Soloist (On a Jazz Recording) and Best Jazz Instrumental Performance, Group.

The AllMusic review by Scott Yanow states, "Branford Marsalis (on tenor and soprano) and his 1987 quartet ... stretch out on a wide repertoire during this generally fascinating set. Very much a chameleon for the date, Marsalis does close impressions of Wayne Shorter, John Coltrane, Ben Webster, Ornette Coleman, and Jan Garbarek. This is one of Branford Marsalis' most interesting (and somewhat unusual) recordings."

Track listing
 "Yes and No" (Wayne Shorter)
 "Crescent City" (Branford Marsalis)
 "Broadway Fools" (Branford Marsalis)
 "LonJellis" (Kenny Kirkland)
 "I Thought About You" (Johnny Mercer, Jimmy Van Heusen)
 "Lonely Woman" (Ornette Coleman)
 "Steep's Theme" (Branford Marsalis)
 "Yesterdays" (Jerome Kern, Otto Harbach) 
 "Crepuscule with Nellie" (Thelonious Monk)

Personnel 
 Branford Marsalis - saxophones
 Kenny Kirkland - piano
 Lewis Nash - drums
 Delbert Felix - bass

References

External links 
 BranfordMarsalis.com

1988 albums
Branford Marsalis albums
Albums produced by George Butler (record producer)